Sandy Santori (born 1954 or 1955) is a Canadian former politician. Santori served as a BC Liberal Member of the Legislative Assembly of British Columbia from 2001 to 2005. He had previously served as the Mayor of Trail, British Columbia and in his youth was the goalie of the Trail Smoke Eaters Junior Hockey and then the Saint Michaels Buzzers of the OKHL. From there Santori went on to play for the Ivy League Cornell Red on a full hockey scholarship.  He represented the riding of West Kootenay-Boundary. He was appointed Minister of Management Services in 2001 and Minister of State for Resource Development in 2004. In January 2005 resigned from the legislature, giving health reasons and a new job as general manager of Rossland-Trail Country Club.

References

British Columbia Liberal Party MLAs
Living people
Mayors of places in British Columbia
Members of the Executive Council of British Columbia
People from Trail, British Columbia
21st-century Canadian politicians
Year of birth uncertain
Year of birth missing (living people)